Grui is a suborder of crane-like birds.

Grui may also refer to:
 Mușetești, a village in Romania
 Grui, a tributary of the river Amaradia in Gorj County, Romania
 Grui, a tributary of the river Dâmbovița in Călărași County, Romania

See also
 Gruiu (disambiguation)